The large moth family Gelechiidae contains the following genera:

Karwandania
Keiferia
Kiwaia
Klimeschiopsis

References

 Natural History Museum Lepidoptera genus database

Gelechiidae
Gelechiid